United Nations Security Council Resolution 374, adopted on August 18, 1975, was the unanimous recommendation of the Council to the General Assembly that the People's Republic of Mozambique be admitted into the United Nations, after the Council's examination the application of the People's Republic of Mozambique (now the Republic of Mozambique) for membership.

See also
 List of United Nations Security Council Resolutions 301 to 400 (1971–1976)

References
Text of the Resolution at undocs.org

External links
 

1975 in Mozambique 
 0374
 0374
 0374
August 1975 events